Freundin (German: Girlfriend) is a German language fortnightly women's magazine published in Munich, Germany. Launched in 1948 it is one of the earliest magazines in its category.

History and profile
Freundin was established in 1948. The magazine is part of Hubert Burda Media and is published by Burda Style Group on a fortnightly basis on Wednesdays. The headquarters of the magazine is in Munich. The magazine which targets women from the age of 25 years.

The magazine started its website in 1996. Renate Rosenthal is one of the former editors-in-chief of Freundin. Nikolaus Albrecht was the editor-in-chief of Freundin between 2012 and 2019.

Circulation
In 2001 Freundin was the thirty-fifth best-selling women's magazine worldwide with a circulation of 605,000 copies. The magazine sold 465,418 copies during the fourth quarter of 2003. During the fourth quarter of 2004 its circulation was 517,269 copies. The circulation of the magazine 516,443 copies in 2010. It sold 366,039 copies in the fourth quarter of 2014. The circulation of the magazine was 237,867 copies in the first quarter of 2018 making it the second best-selling women's magazine in Germany.

See also
List of magazines in Germany

References

External links
 

1948 establishments in Germany
Biweekly magazines published in Germany
German-language magazines
Magazines established in 1948
Magazines published in Munich
Women's magazines published in Germany